Charles J. Shirek (born October 25, 1985) is an American professional baseball pitcher.

Career
Shirek attended the University of Nebraska at Lincoln, where he played college baseball for the Nebraska Cornhuskers baseball team. The Chicago White Sox selected Shirek in the 23rd round of the 2007 Major League Baseball Draft.

In 2012, he pitched to an 11–5 win–loss record with a 3.65 earned run average (ERA) for the Charlotte Knights of the Class AAA International League. His performance led the White Sox to add him to their 40-man roster after the 2012 season. However, during the offseason, the White Sox released Shirek so that he could pursue an opportunity playing in Asia.

NC Dinos (KBO)
Shirek signed with the NC Dinos of the Korea Baseball Organization (KBO). In 2013, he had an 11–7 win-loss record and a 2.48 ERA, which led KBO. After the season, he signed with the NC Dinos to play until 2015.

On June 24, 2014, Shirek threw a no-hitter, becoming the 11th pitcher and the first non-Korean player to record a no-hitter in KBO history.

References

External links 

Career statistics and player information from Korea Baseball Organization

1985 births
Living people
Sportspeople from Minot, North Dakota
Baseball players from North Dakota
Nebraska Cornhuskers baseball players
Kannapolis Intimidators players
Birmingham Barons players
Winston-Salem Dash players
Charlotte Knights players
NC Dinos players
American expatriate baseball players in South Korea
KBO League pitchers